Osteodystrophy is any dystrophic growth of the bone. It is defective bone development that is usually attributable to renal disease or to disturbances in calcium and phosphorus metabolism.

One form is renal osteodystrophy.

See also 
 List of radiographic findings associated with cutaneous conditions

References

External links 

Skeletal disorders